The Whispering Mountain is a 1968 book by Joan Aiken.
For this book, published by Jonathan Cape, she won the Guardian Children's Fiction Prize, a once-in-a-lifetime book award judged by a panel of British children's writers, and she was a commended runner-up for the Carnegie Medal from the Library Association, recognising the year's best children's book by a British writer.

References

1968 children's books
English novels
Novels by Joan Aiken
1968 British novels
Novels about orphans
Jonathan Cape books
Novels set in England
British children's novels